A chaplet is a headdress in the form of a wreath made of  leaves, flowers or twigs woven into a ring. It is typically worn in festive occasions and on holy days. In ancient times it also served as a crown representing victory or authority.

History
In ancient times chaplets made from branches and twigs of trees were worn by victors in sacred contests; these were known as pancarpiae. Later, flowers were used to "heighten the effect" with their color and smell. 
Glyccra challenged Pausias to a contest where she would repeatedly vary her designs, and thus it was (as Pliny described it) "in reality a contest between art and Nature".  This invention is traced only to later than the 100th Olympiad via Pausias paintings.
These "chaplets of flowers" became fashionable and evolved into the Egyptian chaplets using ivy, narcissus, pomegranate blossoms. According to Pliny, P. Claudius Pulcher

In Chapter 5 of Naturalis Historia, titled "The great honour in which chaplets were held by the ancients" Pliny explains the how these head dresses were perceived:

Pliny continues the explanation to describe the severity in which the rules of the wearing of the chaplets were enforced by the "ancients":
L. Fulvius, a banker, having been accused, at the time of the Second Punic War, of looking down from the balcony of his house upon the Forum, with a chaplet of roses upon his head, was imprisoned by order of the Senate, and was not liberated before the war was brought to a close.
P. Munatius, having placed upon his head a chaplet of flowers taken from the statue of Marsyas, was condemned by the Triumviri to be put in chains. Upon his making appeal to the tribunes of the people, they refused to intercede in his behalf 
The daughter of the late Emperor Augustus, who, in her nocturnal debaucheries, placed a chaplet on the statue of Marsyas, conduct deeply deplored in the letters of that god.

Pliny notes that the statue of Marsyas was a meeting place for courtesans, who used to crown it with chaplets of flowers.
He also notes that when Emperor Augustus's daughter Julia placed a chaplet on the statue, she was acknowledging herself to be no better than a courtesan.

The highest and rarest of all military decorations in the Roman Republic and early Roman empire was the Grass Crown (Latin: corona graminea) . It was presented only to a general, commander, or officer  whose actions saved a legion or the entire army. One example of actions leading to awarding of a grass crown would be a general who broke/such as breaking the blockade around a beleaguered Roman army. The crown took the form of a chaplet made from plant materials taken from the battlefield, including grasses, flowers, and various cereals such as wheat, which was presented to the general by the army he had saved.

The corona radiata, the "radiant crown" known best on the Statue of Liberty, and perhaps worn by the Helios that was the Colossus of Rhodes, was worn by Roman emperors as part of the cult of Sol Invictus prior to the Roman Empire's conversion to Christianity. It was referred to as "the chaplet studded with sunbeams” by Lucian, about 180 AD.

Examples

See also
 Corolla (headgear)
 Crancelin
 Vinok

References

Ancient Roman culture
Ancient Greek culture
Headgear
History of clothing (Western fashion)
Floristry